Barbara Buntrock (18 February 1982) is a German violist and music educator.

Life 
Born in Wuppertal, Buntrock received her first violin lessons at the age of five. Since 1991, she was a student of Maria Szabados-Racz at the Bergische Musikschule Wuppertal. She was five times first prize winner of the national Jugend musiziert competition. From 1998 to 2000, Buntrock was a member of the Bundesjugendorchester, most recently as deputy concertmaster. She began her viola studies in 2001 at the Hochschule für Musik und Tanz Köln, Abteilung Wuppertal with Werner Dickel. Since the winter semester 2002/2003, she studied at the Lübeck Academy of Music with Barbara Westphal, where she received her concert diploma in July 2008. Supported by the Gerd Bucerius Scholarship of the Deutsche Stiftung Musikleben, she spent a year abroad (September 2005 to May 2006) at the Juilliard School in New York City with Heidi Castleman. Afterwards, she completed additional studies at the Hochschule für Musik "Hanns Eisler" with Lars Anders Tomter with the aim of obtaining her Konzertexamen. Buntrock was a scholarship holder of the Studienstiftung des deutschen Volkes. She also attended master classes at the Verbier Festival, the International Music Academy of Switzerland and with Walter Levin (LaSalle Quartet), Gábor Takács-Nagy, Lukas Hagen (Hagen Quartet) and Eberhard Feltz.

From February 2009 to December 2010, Buntrock held the position of 1st solo viola of the Leipzig Gewandhaus Orchestra. She plays a viola built around 1650 by Antonio Mariani, which was formerly played by Lionel Tertis. In September 2011, she founded the "Festival 3" as artistic director, a festival for chamber music in the Immanuelskirche in Wuppertal.

Since 2015, Buntrock is professor for viola at the Robert Schumann Hochschule Düsseldorf.

Awards 
 Five times winner of the national Jugend musiziert composition
 2004: Prize winner of the Theodor-Rogler-Stiftung at the ARD International Music Competition
 2005: Dr. Glatt special prize at the Geneva International Music Competition
 2006: Zonta-Musikpreis and a scholarship of the DMW (Deutscher Musikwettbewerb)
 2007: 1. Prize at the 
 2008: Winner of the Federal President's Scholarship at the Felix Mendelssohn Bartholdy Prize
 2008:  der Stadt Wuppertal
 2008: Special prize for the best interpretation of a work by J.S. Bach at the International Primrose Competition in Arizona

References

External links 
 
 
 

German violists
Women violists
German women musicians
1982 births
Living people
Musicians from Wuppertal